American Folk Songs is a 1948 album by Jo Stafford. The original release featured six songs on three 78-RPM discs. It was released as a long-playing record in 1950, with two additional songs. Since the 1962 re-release, the album has featured twelve popular folk songs. The Saturday Review described the album as "of its own excellence."

Judy Collins has cited the album as one of the first to spark her interest in folk music.

Track listing 
All songs are traditional.

References 

1950 albums
Jo Stafford albums
Capitol Records albums
Corinthian Records albums
Albums conducted by Paul Weston
Albums arranged by Paul Weston